Green Party – Green Alternative is centrist, regional, green and minor non-parliamentary party in Croatia. It was registered in Pula in 2003 as "Democratic Green Union – The Greens" (Croatian: Demokratski savez zelenih – Zeleni) . It is one of seven green parties in Croatia. It is led by Josip-Anton Rupnik, who got elected in 2005 local elections for Istrian County Council on the Croatian People's Party/Liberal Party (HNS/LS) coalition list.

This green party is against the legalization of drugs  and pro-natalist.

References

2003 establishments in Croatia
Centrist parties in Croatia
Green political parties in Croatia
Political parties established in 2003
Political parties in Croatia
Regionalist parties in Croatia